Sils or SILS may refer to:

Places
Sils, Girona, a municipality in the comarca of Selva in Catalonia, Spain
Lake Sils (Catalonia), an ancient lake near Sils, Catalonia, Spain
Lake Sils, a lake in the Upper Engadine in the Grisons, Switzerland

Other
 Single Incision Laparoscopic Surgery
 UMass SILS, the Summer Institute in Leadership in Sustainability at the University of Massachusetts Amherst